Melinda Chan Mei Yi (born 10 March 1965 in Macau) is a member of the Legislative Assembly of Macau. She ran for Legislative Assembly in the 2009 legislative election. She is a member of Alliance for Change a pan-establishment party in Macau.

Election results

See also
 List of members of the Legislative Assembly of Macau

References

1961 births
Living people
Cantonese people
Members of the Legislative Assembly of Macau
Macau women in politics